The 1992 Jacksonville State Gamecocks football team was an American football team that represented Jacksonville State University as a member of the Gulf South Conference (GSC) during the 1992 NCAA Division II football season. In their eighth year under head coach Bill Burgess, the team compiled an overall record of 12–1–1 with mark of 5–0–1 against conference opponents, winning the GSC title.

Key players included halfback and return specialist Danny Lee who was named Small College Player of the Year by the Alabama Sports Writers Association and Football Gazette. Head coach Bill Burgess was also named national coach of the year. Assistant coaches included Charlie Maniscalco (offensive coordinator) and Roland Houston (defensive coordinator).

The team played its home games at Paul Snow Memorial Stadium in Jacksonville, Alabama.

Schedule

References

Jacksonville State
Jacksonville State Gamecocks football seasons
NCAA Division II Football Champions
Gulf South Conference football champion seasons
Jacksonville State Gamecocks football